Lupo Alberto (in English Alberto the Wolf) is an Italian animated series aired for the first time in 1997 by The Animation Band in co-production with Rai, inspired by the homonymous character and the same comic book created by Silver; two series were produced for a total of 104 episodes, each of which lasted for seven minutes. The second season is from 2002.

The first season was produced by Rai Fiction, The Animation Band, Canal+, France 2, Europool and Les Armateurs, and the second by Rai Fiction and The Animation Band, but this time distributed by Mondo TV.

The opening theme of the second season is sung by Gianna Nannini was written by Vic Vergeat. The series is available in Italian and English.

Characters
 Lupo Alberto (in English Alberto the Wolf) - A sarcastic and intelligent blue wolf who is a resident of the wood close to the McKenzie farm, Alberto pursues his relationship with Martha. 
 Martha (Marta) - A eccentric and sweet hen who is Alberto's girlfriend. 
 Moses (Mosè) - A mean  sheepdog who is the obstacle to Alberto and Martha.
 Henry The Mole (Enrico La Talpa) - An eccentric and goofy mole
 Esther The Mole (Cesira La Talpa) - Henry's wife
 Alfred (Alfredo) - A turkey
 Ludwig (Lodovico) - A horse
 Einstein (Odoardo) - Einstein is Martha's cousin
 Glycerin (Glicerina) - A duck who has the nickname 
 Krug - A bull
 Omar - A rooster
 Silvietta - A teenage female sparrow
 Arthur (Arturo) - Probably a chicken
 Kant (Alcide) - A philosopher pig
 Alice - Martha's friend, a fat hen

Voices actors

Italian

English
 Thor Bishopric - Lupo Alberto (season 2)
 Francis Michel Pardeilhan - Henry the Mole
 Cathy Weseluck - Martha and Alice (season 1)
 Maria Bircher - Martha (season 2)
 Gregory Snegoff - Moses (season 1)

Episodes

Season 1 (1998)

Season 2 (2001)

Home video
Mondo TV has released all of the first season episodes on 9 VHS tapes and 3 DVD releases, including special features.

The second season was released on DVD only, with 9 episodes each on 2 discs with no special features. 

The DVD releases contain Italian and English audio.

References

External links
 Lupo Alberto at IMDb

French children's animated comedy television series
Italian children's animated comedy television series
Television shows based on comics
Television series about wolves